Éva Szöllösy (born 10 January 1935) is a Hungarian figure skater. She competed in the pairs event at the 1952 Winter Olympics.

References

1935 births
Living people
Hungarian female pair skaters
Olympic figure skaters of Hungary
Figure skaters at the 1952 Winter Olympics
People from Târnăveni